The peach blossom (Thyatira batis) is a moth of the family Drepanidae. It was first described by Carl Linnaeus in his 1758 10th edition of Systema Naturae.

It is found throughout Europe and east through the Palearctic to Japan and Mongolia.  It is a fairly common species in the British Isles.

It is a striking species with brown forewings marked with five pink and white blotches which do rather resemble the petals of peach blossom. The hindwings are buff and grey. The wingspan is 40–45 mm. The species flies at night, in western Europe in June and July sometimes with a partial second brood emerges in late August and September. The species is attracted to light and sugar.

The larva is brown with white markings and several humps along its back. At rest it raises both ends as with many drepanids. It feeds on various Rubus species. The species overwinters as a pupa.

 The flight season refers to the British Isles. This may vary in other parts of the range.

Subspecies 
 Thyatira batis batis (Russia, Mongolia, Japan, Turkey, Iran, Caucasus, Algeria, Europe, China: Heilongjiang, Jilin, Inner Mongolia, Beijing, Hebei, Shaanxi, Gansu, Xinjiang)
 Thyatira batis formosicola Matsumura, 1933 (Taiwan)
 Thyatira batis pallida (Rothschild, 1920) (Sumatra)
 Thyatira batis rubrescens Werny, 1966 (India, Nepal, Vietnam, China: Henan, Shaanxi, Anhui, Zhejiang, Hubei, Jiangxi, Hunan, Fujian, Guangdong, Guangxi, Hainan, Sichuan, Guizhou, Yunnan, Tibet)

References 

 Chinery, Michael Collins Guide to the Insects of Britain and Western Europe 1986 (Reprinted 1991)
 Skinner, Bernard Colour Identification Guide to Moths of the British Isles 1984

External links 

 Peach Blossom at UKMoths
 Lepiforum.de

Thyatirinae
Drepanid moths of Great Britain
Moths of Asia
Moths described in 1758
Moths of Europe
Moths of Japan
Moths of New Zealand
Taxa named by Carl Linnaeus